Daghistani or Daghestani:

People
Abdullah ad-Daghistani
Aslan Khan Daghestani
Fath-Ali Khan Daghestani
Ghazi Mohammed Daghistani
Hasan-Ali Khan Daghestani
Lotf-Ali Khan Daghestani
Murad al-Daghistani
Timoor Daghistani

See also
Daghistanli